Real Time is an art installation series by Dutch designer Maarten Baas. It consists of works in which people manually create and erase the hands on a clock each minute.

The first works in the series were launched in April 2009. They consist of videos in which sweepers move around trash to create the analog clock hands ("Sweeper's clock"), a person behind a translucent screen paints a digital clock, and grandfather clocks in which a man behind a screen paints the analog hands.

In 2016, Baas continued the series with the "Schiphol clock" at the Schiphol Airport in Amsterdam, Netherlands. It depicts a man behind a translucent screen painting the minutes. Baas recorded an actor (Tiago Sá da Costa) for 12 hours to create the video used.

References

External links

Clocks
Installation art works